Seldovia Airport is a public-use gravel airstrip serving Seldovia, Alaska, about 15 miles (27 km) south-southwest from the fishing town of Homer at the Kenai Peninsula's "end of the road." The two towns are separated by Kachemak Bay, a blue-water arm of the North Pacific Ocean's Gulf of Alaska. Known to pilots as "Seldovia" (or more formally), this public airport is located less than a half-mile (2 km) northeast of the small boat harbor serving Seldovia in the Kenai Peninsula Borough, Alaska, United States. This airport is publicly owned by the State of Alaska Department of Transportation and Public Facilities (DOT&PF) - Central Region. A two-lane gravel street named Airport Avenue leads about a half-mile (1 km) from the airport to the center of Seldovia at the Small Boat Harbor, which is surrounded by several cafes, businesses, and small hotels.

Facilities and aircraft 

For the 12-month period ending December 31, 2005, the airport had 5,660 aircraft operations, an average of 15 per day: 62% general aviation and 38% air taxi.

There are 15 aircraft based at this airport, 14 of which are single engine and one multi-engine.

References

External links 
 Airport diagram (GIF)

Airports in Kenai Peninsula Borough, Alaska